The Ovintiv Events Centre (formerly named Encana Events Centre to June 2021), is a multipurpose arena located in Dawson Creek, British Columbia.  The name change came about due to a reorganization of the former Encana Corporation, where the organization adopted the new name "Ovintiv Inc." The facility has 4,500 permanent seats and can seat up to 6,500 for concerts.

References

External links
Ovintiv Events Centre 

Indoor arenas in British Columbia
Sports venues in British Columbia
Dawson Creek
Indoor ice hockey venues in Canada